Pablo Derqui Maestre (born 1976) is a Spanish actor from Catalonia. An accomplished stage actor, he is better known to the wider public for his performances in television series such as Hispania, Isabel, Pulsaciones or Cathedral of the Sea.

Biography 
Born on 10 August 1976 in Barcelona, Pablo Derqui Maestre is "family-related and spiritually" linked to Petrer, province of Alicante. After earning a degree in humanities, he earned an acting degree from the Barcelona's Institut del Teatre.

Some of his stage credits include performances in plays such as Roberto Zucco, Desde Berlín, L'orfe del clan dels Zhao, Una giornata particolare and Calígula.

Filmography 

Film

Television

Accolades

References 

Male actors from Barcelona
1976 births
21st-century Spanish male actors
Spanish male television actors
Spanish male film actors
Spanish male stage actors
Living people